Paludella is a genus of mosses belonging to the family Meesiaceae.

The genus was first described by Jakob Friedrich Ehrhart.

The species of this genus are found in Northern Hemisphere.

Species:
Paludella squarrosa Bridel, 1817

References

Splachnales
Moss genera